Nana Osei Afriyie Gyamerah II, also known as "Nana Piasehene", is the chief of a town called Piase in the Ashanti Region of Ghana. He was born on 7 April 1967 in Kumasi, Ashanti Region.  He was enstooled as chief on 26 April 2004 after the previous chief, Nana Atta Fosu, died.

References

External links
Chief cuts sod for construction of health center at Piase - MyJoyOnline.com
Businessman enstooled as Piasehene

Living people
People from Ashanti Region
Political office-holders in Ghana
Year of birth missing (living people)